Richard Lawson of High Riggs,  (c. 1450–1507) was a Scottish landlord, diplomat and lawyer who was made Lord Provost of Edinburgh in 1492 and Justice-Clerk-General to the King in 1504. He was the father of James Lawson, an MP of the Scottish Parliament, and the grandfather of James Lawson, Lord Lawson, who was made Lord Provost of Edinburgh in 1532.

Career
Lawson was trained as a lawyer and largely served the country in the role of ambassador in treaties with England and as King's Council. He served as Town Clerk in Edinburgh in 1482. He was Justice-Clerk from 1489 and was still in post described as Justice-Clerk-General to the King in January 1504/5.

He was one of the counsellors appointed for managing the affairs of King James IV. Along with Alexander Home of that Ilk, Chamberlain of Scotland, and others, he was one of the Commissioners appointed to ratify the treaty concluded at Coldstream on 5 October 1488 for a three years' truce with England. On 30 May 1490 he was one of the Commissioners of the King who, with 300 horsemen, had a Safe-Conduct for two months to enter England, remain and return.  On the 25th June 1492 he was one of the King's Commissioners who concluded a new 7 year treaty with England, and on 28 July the next year was again a Commissioner in a party of ambassadors to England for 6 months; and yet again on 22 May 1495 he was one of the Ambassadors, with 100 horsemen, who had a Safe Conduct to England for 6 months. 

He was one of the ambassadors of Scotland, who concluded a new 7 year treaty with England, at Ayton, Berwickshire, on 30 September 1497, ratified by King James on 10 February 1497/8 in the presence of Don Pedro de Ayala, Prothonotary of the King & Queen of Spain and their ambassador to Scotland.

Family
He owned a country estate known as Cairnmuir House in the Pentland Hills which he gave to his eldest son, Richard Jr, in October 1504. Another son, Robert Lawson, was killed in action at the Battle of Flodden in 1513. Another son, James Lawson, was elected as an MP of the Scottish Parliament in 1528 and again in 1532.

His grandson James Lawson, Lord Lawson, became both a Senator of the College of Justice and Provost of Edinburgh in 1532.

References

1450 births
1507 deaths
Lawyers from Edinburgh
Lord Provosts of Edinburgh
Year of birth uncertain